The eighth season of Beverly Hills, 90210, is an American drama television series aired from September 10, 1997 on FOX and concluded on May 20, 1998 after 32 episodes. This season follows the gang after college and into adulthood as they struggle with issues such as terrible working conditions, rape allegations, relationships, infidelity, self-harm, sexual harassment, shootings, amnesia, parenthood, drug abuse, prostitution, homosexual rights, child molestation and crime.

The eighth season aired Wednesday nights at 8/9c and was released on DVD in 2009.

Overview
The gang after college and into adulthood as they cope with a variety of challenges that adults confront in their personal and professional life, such as awful working conditions, rape allegations, romances, infidelity, sexual harassment, shootings, amnesia, motherhood, drug abuse, prostitution, homosexual rights, and crime. With college over, the friends are realizing that life after graduation is not as simple as they had imagined! In all 30 tantalizing episodes, Brandon, Kelly, Donna, David, Steve, Val, and two newbies Noah and Carly as they explore love and life outside of college.

Cast

Starring
 Jason Priestley as Brandon Walsh  
 Jennie Garth as Kelly Taylor  
 Ian Ziering as Steve Sanders
 Brian Austin Green as David Silver 
 Tori Spelling as Donna Martin  
 Tiffani Thiessen as Valerie Malone  
 Joe E. Tata as Nat Bussichio  
 Hilary Swank as Carly Reynolds (episodes 1–17)
 Vincent Young as Noah Hunter

Recurring
 Lindsay Price as Janet Sosna

Notable guest stars
Gabrielle Carteris as Andrea Zuckerman 
James Eckhouse as Jim Walsh 
Carol Potter as Cindy Walsh

Episodes

Source:

References

1997 American television seasons
1998 American television seasons
Beverly Hills, 90210 seasons